Mike Boone (born June 30, 1995) is an American football running back for the Houston Texans of the National Football League (NFL). He played college football at Cincinnati and signed with the Minnesota Vikings as an undrafted free agent in 2018.

Early years
Boone attended and played high school football as a wide receiver at Baker County High School in Glen St. Mary, Florida. As a senior in 2013, he helped lead Baker County to a 7-3 record, catching 57 passes for 1,068 yards and 18 touchdowns, including 211 receiving yards in a single game which set a school record. Boone also lettered in basketball and track. He committed to the University of Cincinnati, choosing the Bearcats over FIU and Idaho, among others.

College career
Boone attended and played college football at the University of Cincinnati from 2014–2017.

Collegiate statistics

Professional career

Minnesota Vikings

2018
Boone signed with the Minnesota Vikings as an undrafted free agent on April 30, 2018. After an impressive preseason where he finished fourth in the league with 195 rushing yards, he made the Vikings 53-man roster and made his NFL debut in Week 3 against the Buffalo Bills. In the 27–6 loss, he had two carries for 11 rushing yards. He finished his rookie season with 11 carries for 47 yards.

2019
In Week 15 of the 2019 season against the Los Angeles Chargers, starting running back Dalvin Cook left the game with a shoulder injury which increased Boone's playing time as a result.  During the game, Boone rushed 13 times for 56 yards and two touchdowns in the 39–10 win. In Week 17 against the Chicago Bears, Boone rushed 17 times for 148 yards and a touchdown during the 21–19 loss. Overall, Boone finished the 2019 season with 273 rushing yards and three rushing touchdowns.

2020
In Week 4 of the 2020 season against the Houston Texans, Boone forced a fumble on punt returner DeAndre Carter which was recovered by the Vikings during the 31–23 win.  Boone was named the NFC Special Teams Player of the Week for his performance in Week 4.

Denver Broncos
On March 18, 2021, Boone signed a two-year contract with the Denver Broncos. He was placed on injured reserve on September 1, 2021 to start the season. He was activated on October 16. 

After suffering an ankle injury, Boone was placed on injured reserve on October 24, 2022. He was activated on December 3, but placed back on injured reserve 10 days later after suffering an ankle injury in Week 14.

Houston Texans
On March 17, 2023, Boone signed a two-year contract with the Houston Texans.

References

External links
Minnesota Vikings bio
Cincinnati Bearcats bio

1995 births
Living people
American football running backs
Cincinnati Bearcats football players
Denver Broncos players
Minnesota Vikings players
Houston Texans players
People from Baker County, Florida
Players of American football from Florida